The 2022–23 UEFA Women's Champions League qualifying rounds began on 18 August and ended on 29 September 2022.

A total of 68 teams competed in the group stage qualifying rounds of the 2022–23 UEFA Women's Champions League, which included two rounds, with 46 teams in the Champions Path and 22 teams in the League Path. The 12 winners in the round 2 (seven from Champions Path, five from League Path) advanced to the group stage, to join the four teams that enter in that round.

Times are CEST (UTC+2), as listed by UEFA (local times, if different, are in parentheses).

Teams

Champions Path 
The Champions Path included all league champions which did not qualify directly for the group stage, and consisted of the following rounds:
Round 1 (42 teams playing one-legged semi-finals, final and third place match): 42 teams which entered in this round.
Round 2 (14 teams): three teams which entered in this round and eleven winners of the round 1 finals.

Below are the participating teams of the Champions Path (with their 2022 UEFA club coefficients), grouped by the starting rounds.

League Path 
The League Path includes all league non-champions and consists of the following rounds:
Round 1 (16 teams playing one-legged semi-finals, final and third place match): 16 teams which enter in this round.
Round 2 (10 teams): six teams which enter in this round and four winners of the round 1 finals.

Below are the participating teams of the League Path (with their 2022 UEFA club coefficients), grouped by the starting rounds.

Format 
Round 1 consisted of mini-tournaments with two semi-finals, a final and a third-place play-off hosted by one of the participating teams. If the score was level at the end of normal time, extra time was played, and if the same amount of goals wer escored by both teams during extra time, the tie was decided by a penalty shoot-out. Round 2 was played over two legs, with each team playing one leg at home. The team that scored more goals on aggregate over the two legs advanced to the next round. If the aggregate score was level at the end of normal time of the second leg, extra time was played, and if the same amount of goals was scored by both teams at the end of normal time, the tie was decided by a penalty shoot-out. An additional preliminary round consisting of two-legged home-and-away matches would have been played by the champions from the lowest-ranked associations if more than 50 associations had entered the tournament and the title holders hadn't qualified through league position. Since only 50 associations entered, this round was skipped.

In the draws for each round, teams were seeded based on their UEFA club coefficients at the beginning of the season, with the teams divided into seeded and unseeded pots containing the same number of teams. Prior to the draws, UEFA may form "groups" in accordance with the principles set by the Club Competitions Committee, but they are purely for convenience of the draw and do not resemble any real groupings in the sense of the competition. Teams from associations with political conflicts as decided by UEFA may not be drawn into the same tie. After the draws, the order of legs of a tie could have been reversed by UEFA due to scheduling or venue conflicts.

Schedule 
The schedule of the competition is as follows (all draws are held at the UEFA headquarters in Nyon, Switzerland).

Round 1 

The draw for Round 1 was held on 24 June 2022. A total of 58 teams played in Round 1.

Seeding 
Seeding of teams for the semi-final round was based on their 2022 UEFA club coefficients, with 22 seeded teams and 20 unseeded teams in the Champions Path, and eight seeded teams and eight unseeded teams in the League Path. Teams were drawn into two semi-finals within each four team group and, for the groups with three teams, the team with the highest coefficient was given a bye to the final. In the semi-finals, seeded teams were considered the "home" team, while in the third-place play-offs and finals, the teams with the highest coefficients was considered the "home" team for administrative purposes. Due to political reasons, teams from the following associations could not be drawn into the same group: Kosovo / Bosnia and Herzegovina; Kosovo / Serbia; Ukraine / Belarus.

Champions Path

Tournament 1

Bracket 

Hosted by Pomurje.

Semi-finals

Third-place play-off

Final

Tournament 2

Bracket 

Hosted by PAOK.

Semi-finals

Third-place play-off

Final

Tournament 3

Bracket 

Hosted by Split.

Semi-finals

Third-place play-off

Final

Tournament 4

Bracket 

Hosted by Apollon Limassol.

Semi-finals

Third-place play-off

Final

Tournament 5

Bracket 

Hosted by UKS SMS Łódź.

Semi-finals

Third-place play-off

Final

Tournament 6

Bracket 

Hosted by Juventus.

Semi-finals

Third-place play-off

Final

Tournament 7

Bracket 

Hosted by U Olimpia Cluj.

Semi-finals

Third-place play-off

Final

Tournament 8

Bracket 

Hosted by Twente.

Semi-finals

Third-place play-off

Final

Tournament 9

Bracket 

Hosted by Ljuboten.

Semi-finals

Third-place play-off

Final

Tournament 10

Bracket 

Hosted by Breznica.

Semi-finals

Final

Tournament 11

Bracket 

Hosted by Spartak Subotica.

Semi-finals

Final

League Path

Tournament 1

Bracket 

Hosted by Glasgow City.

Semi-finals

Third-place play-off

Final

Tournament 2

Bracket 

Hosted by Rosenborg.

Semi-finals

Third-place play-off

Final

Tournament 3

Bracket 

Hosted by Fortuna Hjørring.

Semi-finals

Third-place play-off

Final

Tournament 4

Bracket 

Hosted by Real Madrid.

Semi-finals

Third-place play-off

Final

Round 2 

The draw for Round 2 was held on 1 September 2022, at 13:00 CEST.

Seeding 
A total of 24 teams played in Round 2. They were divided into two paths:
Champions Path (14 teams): three teams which entered in this round, and 11 winners of Round 1 (Champions Path).
League Path (10 teams): six teams which entered in this round, and four winners of Round 1 (League Path).
Seeding of teams was based on their 2022 UEFA club coefficients, with 7 seeded teams and 7 unseeded teams in the Champions Path, and 5 seeded teams and 5 unseeded teams in the League Path. Teams from the same association in the League Path could not be drawn against each other. The first team drawn in each tie would be the home team of the first leg.

Summary 

The first legs were played on 20 and 21 September 2022, and the second legs on 28 and 29 September 2022.

The winners of the ties advanced to the group stage.

|+Champions Path

|}

|+League Path

|}

Champions Path 

Vllaznia won 3–2 on aggregate.

Zürich won 10–0 on aggregate.

Benfica won 5–3 on aggregate.

St. Pölten won 3–2 on aggregate.

Slavia Prague won 1–0 on aggregate.

Rosengård won 4–2 on aggregate.

Juventus won 3–1 on aggregate.

League Path 

Arsenal won 3–2 on aggregate.

Paris Saint-Germain won 4–1 on aggregate.

Bayern Munich won 4–1 on aggregate.

Real Madrid won 5–1 on aggregate.

Roma won 6–2 on aggregate.

Notes

References

External links 

1
August 2022 sports events in Europe
September 2022 sports events in Europe